Dauphins de Créteil is a French swimming and water polo club from Créteil, Paris founded in 1973. It is best known for its women's team, which won eight national championships in a row between 1986 and 1993. In 1987 it was the runner-up of the inaugural edition of the European Cup.

Titles
French Championship (8)
 1986, 1987, 1988, 1989, 1990, 1991, 1992, 1993

References

Water polo clubs in France
Créteil
Sports clubs in Paris
Sports clubs established in 1973